The 3rd Filipino Academy of Movie Arts and Sciences Awards Night was held in 1955 at Fiesta Pavilion in Manila Hotel.

Salabusab, by Premiere Productions, Inc., is the recipient of this edition's FAMAS Award for Best Picture.

Awards

Major Awards
Winners are listed first and highlighted with boldface.

References

External links
The Unofficial Website of the Filipino Academy of Movie Arts and Sciences
FAMAS Awards 

FAMAS Award
FAMAS
FAMAS